Give Me a Sailor is a 1938 comedy film directed by Elliott Nugent, starring Martha Raye, Bob Hope, Betty Grable and Jack Whiting. This was Raye and Hope's third film together, the first in which they played the leads.

Plot

Jim and Walter Brewster are brothers and naval officers; both of whom are in love with Nancy Larkin, much to the chagrin of Nancy's sister Letty.  Walter has the inside track with Nancy, but Jim & Letty conspire to keep them apart.  There are various comic shenanigans and a "Beautiful Legs" contest that Letty enters in error, but wins and becomes an instant celebrity.  Fame and fortune are showered upon her and she and Jim realize that they are meant for each other.

Cast
 Martha Raye as Letty Larkin
 Bob Hope as Jim Brewster
 Betty Grable as Nancy Larkin
 Jack Whiting as Walter Brewster
 Clarence Kolb as Captain Tallant
 J.C. Nugent as Mr. Larkin
 Bonnie Jean Churchill as Ethel May Brewster
 Nana Bryant as Mrs. Minnie Brewster

References

External links
 
 
 
 

1938 films
Films directed by Elliott Nugent
American black-and-white films
American films based on plays
American musical comedy films
1938 romantic comedy films
American romantic musical films
1930s romantic musical films
Paramount Pictures films
1930s English-language films
1930s American films